The 1946 Calgary Stampeders finished in 1st place in the W.I.F.U. with a 5–3 record. They were defeated in the W.I.F.U. Finals by the Winnipeg Blue Bombers.

Regular season

Season standings

Season schedule

Playoffs

Finals

Winnipeg won the total-point series by 30–21. Winnipeg advances to the Grey Cup game.

References

Calgary Stampeders seasons
1946 Canadian football season by team